Chris Harper or Christopher Harper may refer to:
 Christopher J. Harper (born 1951), American journalist
 Sir Chris Harper (RAF officer) (born 1957), British air marshal
 Christopher Harper (actor) (born 1977), British actor
 Chris Harper (wide receiver, born 1989), American football wide receiver
 Chris Harper (wide receiver, born 1993), American football wide receiver 
 Chris Harper (cyclist) (born 1994), Australian cyclist
 Chris Harper (bishop), bishop of Saskatoon
 Chris Harper, creator of the fictional Landover Baptist Church
 Christopher Harper-Mercer, perpetrator of the Umpqua Community College shooting